Fanny Carolina Rodríguez Rivas (born 29 January 1990) is a Honduran footballer who plays as a forward. She has been a member of the Honduras women's national team.

International career
Rodríguez capped for Honduras at senior level during the 2014 CONCACAF Women's Championship qualification.

International goals
Scores and results list Honduras' goal tally first

References
 

1990 births
Living people
Honduran women's footballers
Women's association football forwards
Honduras women's international footballers